Job Evans Stevenson (February 10, 1832 – July 24, 1922) was an American lawyer and politician who served two terms as a U.S. Representative from Ohio from 1869 to 1873,

Early life and career 
Born in Yellow Bud, Ohio, Stevenson completed preparatory studies.
He studied law.
He was admitted to the bar and commenced the practice of his profession in Chillicothe, Ohio.
He also engaged in agricultural pursuits.
He served as member of the Ohio Senate 1863-1865.
He served as solicitor of Chillicothe 1859-1862.
He was an unsuccessful candidate for election in 1864 to the Thirty-ninth Congress.
He moved to Cincinnati, Ohio, in 1865.

Congress 
He was elected as a Republican to the Forty-first and Forty-second Congresses (March 4, 1869 – March 3, 1873).

Later career and death 
He resumed the practice of law in Cincinnati, Ohio.
Resided in Lexington and Corinth, Kentucky.
He died in Corinth, Kentucky, July 24, 1922.
He was interred in Yellow Bud Cemetery, Yellow Bud, Ohio.

Sources

1832 births
1922 deaths
Politicians from Chillicothe, Ohio
Politicians from Cincinnati
Republican Party Ohio state senators
Ohio lawyers
19th-century American lawyers
Republican Party members of the United States House of Representatives from Ohio